The 2021 NAB League season may refer to:

 The 2021 NAB League Boys season, the under-age Australian rules football season for male footballers
 The 2021 NAB League Girls season, the under-age Australian rules football season for female footballers